Tinlib was an integrated library system based on a database management system named Tinman. The system was developed for MS-DOS and UNIX.

History 
Tinlib was developed in 1985 by Dr. Peter Noerr, who also founded IME Ltd. (Information Management & Engineering) in London. During the 1980s, the system became widespread, especially in Britain, the United States, and English-speaking countries such as South Africa and Australia.

Tinlib lost market share with the introduction of graphical interfaces like Windows and OPAC. There remained a market for a time in eastern Europe; a Romanian subsidiary, IME Romania, took over Tinlib when IME Ltd. was closed in 2002. IME Romania further developed the system for Tinread.

References

External links 
 Cibbarelli's Surveys: User Ratings of Information Navigator Software
 http://www.ime.ro/en/
 http://www.ifnet.it
 http://www.tinread.ro/

Library automation
DOS software
Unix software